The Criterion Theatre is situated in Earlsdon, Coventry, England.  It puts on about seven shows a year. The company has won the Godiva Award for best theatre in the region several times.
The current patrons are Pete Waterman, music producer and railway preservationist, born in Coventry and Ron Cook, stage and screen actor of Thunderbirds and Doctor Who fame, who first acted as an amateur at the Criterion.  The Coventry born actor, Sir Nigel Hawthorne (1929–2001), was a former patron.

Theatre building
The building was built in the 1880s and served as the Earlsdon Methodist Church until 1923, when it was replaced by a new church on the corner of Albany Road and Earlsdon Avenue South. It was then used as a Sunday school and as a venue for a variety of community events. It was sold by the Methodists in 1960 to the Criterion Players, a local church amateur dramatic society that had formed in 1955. The building was converted and with one stage, the Criterion Theatre was opened in 1961 by Mr S.H. Newshome, a patron, who was the Managing Director of the Coventry Hippodrome (now demolished).

References

External links
Criterion Theatre website
Coventry City Council.  Theatre and the Arts.

Theatres in Coventry